Theodore Tuttle Woodruff (April 8, 1811 – May 2, 1892) was an American inventor.

Biography
Theodore Tuttle Woodruff was born in Jefferson County, New York on April 8, 1811.

He married Eliza Lord Hemenway on July 25, 1833, and they had two children.

On December 2, 1856, Woodruff received two patents for a convertible car seat, which led to his invention of the sleeping car for railroads. He also helped to manage the Pennsylvania Railroad through its general manager Andrew Carnegie.

Woodruff also invented a coffee-hulling machine, a surveyor's compass and a steam plow.

He lost his fortune in the Panic of 1873.

He was killed when he was struck by a train in Philadelphia on May 2, 1892.

Legacy
One of Woodruff's descendants was the 20th century diplomat, Charles Woodruff Yost.

See also
Andrew Carnegie

References

1811 births
1892 deaths
19th-century American inventors
People from Jefferson County, New York
Railway accident deaths in the United States